Cobweb is an upcoming American horror thriller film directed by Samuel Bodin and starring Antony Starr and Lizzy Caplan. It will be Bodin's feature directorial debut. The screenplay, by Chris Thomas Devlin, was included in the 2018 Black List.

Cast
Antony Starr as Mark
Lizzy Caplan as Carol
Cleopatra Coleman as Miss Devine
Woody Norman as Peter

Production
In May 2020, it was announced that Samuel Bodin would direct the film for Lionsgate, and that Seth Rogen, Evan Goldberg, James Weaver, Roy Lee and Jon Berg would produce it.

Casting
It was announced in September 2020 that Caplan, Starr, Coleman and Norman would star in the film.

Filming
Principal photography was set to commence in September 2020 in Bulgaria.  Filming occurred in Nu Boyana Film Studios in November 2020.

References

External links
 

Upcoming films
American horror thriller films
Films produced by Evan Goldberg
Films produced by Roy Lee
Films produced by Seth Rogen
Films shot at Nu Boyana Film Studios
Films with screenplays by Chris Thomas Devlin
Lionsgate films
Point Grey Pictures films
Upcoming directorial debut films
Vertigo Entertainment films